This is a list of albums by R. Stevie Moore. Most are not officially released and originally only available as handmade cassettes.

Albums

Compilations

Live albums

Singles/EPs

Other recordings

References 

Moore, R Stevie